The National Automobile Museum is an automobile museum in Encamp, Andorra.

Exhibitions
The museum has a collection of 80 vehicles, 60 motorbikes and around 100 bicycles. It also features mini figures, posters, advertisements, accessories etc.

See also
 List of museums in Andorra

References

Automotive museums
Encamp
Museums in Andorra